Nigella arvensis, the field nigella or wild fennel flower, is a species of flowering plant in the family Ranunculaceae. It is native to North Africa, central, southern and eastern Europe, the Caucasus region, and the Middle East as far as Iran, and has gone extinct in Switzerland and Crete. It is a minor crop, used locally as a substitute for Nigella sativa, black caraway.

Subtaxa
The following subtaxa are accepted:
Nigella arvensis var. anatolica  – Turkey
Nigella arvensis var. iranica  – Iran
Nigella arvensis subsp. latilabris  – Israel
Nigella arvensis var. longicornis  – Turkey, Levant, Iraq
Nigella arvensis subsp. negevensis  – Israel
Nigella arvensis var. oblanceolata  – Turkey
Nigella arvensis subsp. palaestina  – Turkey, Levant
Nigella arvensis var. simplicifolia  – Iraq

References

arvensis
Spices
Flora of North Africa
Flora of France
Flora of Sardinia
Flora of Southeastern Europe
Flora of Central Europe
Flora of Belarus
Flora of Ukraine
Flora of the Crimean Peninsula
Flora of South European Russia
Flora of the Caucasus
Flora of Western Asia
Taxa named by Carl Linnaeus
Plants described in 1753